The women's singles of the 2015 Advantage Cars Prague Open tournament was played on clay in Prague, Czech Republic.

This was the 11th edition of the tournament.

María Teresa Torró Flor won the title, defeating Denisa Allertová in the final, 6–3, 7–6(7–5).

Seeds

Main draw

Finals

Top half

Bottom half

References

External Links
 Main draw

Advantage Cars Prague Open - Singles
Advantage Cars Prague Open